The Stuart Building is a historic 10-story building in Lincoln, Nebraska. It was built by the Olson Construction Company in 1927 for the Stuart Investment Company, founded in 1880. It was designed in the Art Deco and Gothic Revival styles by Ellery L. Davis of Davis and Wilson. It has been listed on the National Register of Historic Places since December 23, 2003.

References

	
National Register of Historic Places in Lincoln, Nebraska
Art Deco architecture in Nebraska
Gothic Revival architecture in Nebraska
Buildings and structures completed in 1927
1927 establishments in Nebraska